Khonoma is an Angami Naga village located about 20 km west from the state capital, Kohima in Nagaland, India. The village is referred to as Khwüno-ra (named after the Angami term for a local plant, Glouthera fragrantissima). The total population of the village is about 1943, settled in 424 households. It is the first green village in India.

History

From 1830 to 1880, Angami Naga warriors from Khonoma fought a series of fierce battles against the British to stop them from force recruiting Nagas as bonded labourers. On 13 October 1879, G. H. Damant, a political officer of the Naga Hills, led a troop of 87 British soldiers to Khonoma to enforce a tax and the British recruitment of bonded labour. The British troop was ambushed by the Angami warriors and in the ensuing battle, 27 British including G. H. Damant were killed.

Thereafter, the British called in reinforcements and laid siege to the tiny village. After holding out for four months, a peace treaty was eventually signed with the British on 27 March 1880. Known as the 'Battle of Khonoma' this was the last organised resistance by the Nagas against the British.

In 1890, the British introduced Christianity, and over a period of time, most of the villagers became Christians.

Geography
The terrain of the village is hilly, ranging from gentle slopes to steep and rugged hillsides. The hills are covered with lush forestland, rich in various species of flora and fauna. The state bird, Blyth's tragopan, a pheasant now nationally endangered, is found here.

Demographics
Khonoma is a medium size village located in Sechü Zubza sub-division of Kohima District, Nagaland with total 424 families residing. The Khonoma village has population of 1943 of which 919 are males while 1024 are females as per Population Census 2011.

The village is divided into three clans (thinuos), namely Merhü-ma (M-Khel), Semo-ma (S-Khel) and Thevo-ma (T-Khel).

Khonoma village has higher literacy rate compared to Nagaland. In 2011, literacy rate of Khonoma village was 83.41% compared to 79.55% of Nagaland. In Khonoma Male literacy stands at 93.72% while female literacy rate was 74.19%.

Khonoma Nature Conservation and Tragopan Sanctuary
In 1998, alarmed after 300 endangered Blyth's tragopans (Tragopan blythii) were killed by the villagers in one week as part of a hunting competition, the village council demarcated a 20 sqkm area within which hunting was banned and the Khonoma Nature Conservation and Tragopan Sanctuary (KNCTS) was created. In 2005, due to the successful conservation efforts of the village, the village was named India’s first "green village".

See also
 Angami Naga
 Naga people

References

Naga people
Villages in Kohima district